Greg Hastings' Tournament Paintball is a 2004 first-person paintball game released exclusively for the Xbox. The game gathered a cult following, consistently appearing on the Xbox Live Top 25 list posted by Major Nelson, peaking at the number nine position. A spin-off, Greg Hastings Tournament Paintball MAX'D, was also released on multiple platforms many months later, with a full sequel released in 2010 for the Wii, PlayStation 3 and Xbox 360.

Features 
3 game types to play: Elimination, Capture the Flag, Center Flag
Cheat Meter: try to wipe paint without getting caught
 Switch marker hands from left to right
 14 top pro paintball players
 25 real-life paintball sponsors to provide an authentic experience
 Real-life paintball fields and tournament locations

Single-player 
19 tournaments to play
98 different field layouts
Play against up to 80 different opponent teams, including 69 real life teams
Advance from rookie to novice to amateur to pro
Gain experience points and increase your skills

Multiplayer 
Xbox Live and System Link enabled
Communicate on the field with the use of XboxT voice communicator
Play online with up to 7-on-7 team play
20 unique locations to play
179 different field layouts

Reception 
Tournament Paintball was a runner-up for GameSpots 2004 "Most Surprisingly Good Game" award, which went to The Chronicles of Riddick: Escape from Butcher Bay.

References

External links 
 Official Website
 Activision Value's GHTP page
 The Whole Experience, developers of GHTP
 GHTP page on Xbox.com
 Paintball Game Online

2004 video games
First-person shooters
Multiplayer and single-player video games
Paintball video games
Video games developed in the United States
Xbox games
Xbox-only games